The Sventiany Offensive (now Švenčionys) was a military operation mostly undertaken by the Imperial German Army's 10th Army against the Imperial Russian Army's 10th Army on the Eastern Front during World War I.

On 9 September 1915, the Germans broke through the Russian defences and four German cavalry divisions, reinforced from 13 September 1915 by two others, went into the breach to gain the rear of the Russian 10th Army. Later the German cavalry operations, devoid of infantry and artillery support, weakened; and on 15–16 September 1915 the newly formed Russian 2nd Army finally stopped the German attack. The Russians attempted to push the Germans back and eliminate the Sventiany breach, however, on 2 October 1915, German reinforcements held against the Russian attack and inflicted heavy casualties on the Russians.

Sources 
Yevseyev, I. Sventyanski proryv, Moscow, 1936.

References

1915 in the Russian Empire
Battles of the Eastern Front (World War I)
Battles of World War I involving Germany
Battles of World War I involving Russia
Military history of Lithuania
Conflicts in 1915
September 1915 events
October 1915 events
Švenčionys